Embassy of Thailand in New Delhi is the diplomatic mission of Thailand to India, the ambassador being Pattarat Hongtong. The embassy serves the Northern, Western, Central, Eastern and North-Eastern regions of India; it also includes Bhutan in its jurisdiction. Thailand also has a Consulate General in Chennai that serves the region of South India and is affiliated with the embassy.

History 
After establishing diplomatic relations between the countries on 1 August 1947, they each built consulates initially in corresponding capitals, and upgraded to post on 3 October 1951.
Initial building was leased in Aurangzeb Road, later shifting it to present location. The ambassador's residence was constructed in 1955.

List of ambassadors 

The first ambassador to India was Thanat Khoman. Present ambassador is Ms. Patrat Hongthong.

Events 
The embassy organizes various education, cultural and bilateral events as well.

The events are regional as well as bilateral basis.

See also 
 India–Thailand relations
 Consulate General of Thailand, Chennai
 List of ambassadors of Thailand to India
 List of diplomatic missions of Thailand
 List of diplomatic missions in India
 Foreign relations: India | Thailand

External links 
 Royal Thai Embassy in New Delhi

References 

India–Thailand relations
Diplomatic missions of Thailand
Diplomatic missions in India
Diplomatic missions in New Delhi